Jehanara Nabi (born 14 July 2004) is a Pakistani swimmer who has set multiple national records. She competed in the women's 200 metre freestyle event at the 2021 FINA World Swimming Championships (25 m) in Abu Dhabi. She competed in the women's 200 metre freestyle and women's 400 metre freestyle events at the 2022 World Aquatics Championships held in Budapest, Hungary.

References

External links
 

2004 births
Living people
Pakistani female freestyle swimmers
Place of birth missing (living people)
Swimmers at the 2022 Commonwealth Games
Commonwealth Games competitors for Pakistan
21st-century Pakistani women